John Thomson "Ian" Johnson (1930–2001) was a British water polo player. He competed at the 1948 Summer Olympics and the 1952 Summer Olympics.

See also
 Great Britain men's Olympic water polo team records and statistics
 List of men's Olympic water polo tournament goalkeepers

References

External links
 

1930 births
2001 deaths
Water polo goalkeepers
British male water polo players
Olympic water polo players of Great Britain
Water polo players at the 1948 Summer Olympics
Water polo players at the 1952 Summer Olympics
Place of birth missing